André-Raphael Loemba is a republic of the Congo politician, who served as Minister of Hydrocarbons from 15 September 2009 to 10 August 2015.

He was superseded at this position by Jean-Marc Thystère Tchicaya.

References 

Living people
Government ministers of the Republic of the Congo
Year of birth missing (living people)